WHCQ-LD, virtual channel 8 (VHF digital channel 9), is a low-powered Antenna TV-affiliated television station licensed to Cleveland, Mississippi, United States. The station is within the Greenwood and Greenville, Mississippi market, which is equidistant between Jackson and Memphis, Tennessee.  Owned by Ellington Broadcasting, it is a sister station to Clarksdale-licensed Cozi TV affiliate WPRQ-LD (channel 12). The station is located on Highway 8 West in Cleveland; WHCQ-LD's transmitter is located northeast of Boyle, Mississippi. The station was once affiliated with Ion Television, MyNetworkTV and This TV. In early 2020, the station changed its affiliation from This TV to Antenna TV. The station's subchannels are Bounce 8.2, Court TV 8.3, ION Mystery 8.4, Grit 8.5, Laff 8.6, and Cozi TV 8.7.

Digital channels
The station's digital signal is multiplexed:

References

Bolivar County, Mississippi
HCQ-LD
This TV affiliates
Bounce TV affiliates
Antenna TV affiliates
Cozi TV affiliates
Grit (TV network) affiliates
Laff (TV network) affiliates
Television channels and stations established in 1990
Low-power television stations in the United States
1990 establishments in Mississippi